Alexander Ross (13 April 169920 May 1784) was a Scottish poet.

Biography 
Alexander Ross was born to a farming family at Torphins in Aberdeenshire. He was educated at Marischal College, Aberdeen and worked as private tutor for the children of Sir William Forbes of Craigievar. In 1732 he became a headmaster in Lochlee, Angus, where he would live until his death in 1784. He had been in the habit of writing verse for his own amusement when, in 1768, at the suggestion of James Beattie, he published Helenore, or the Fortunate Shepherdess.  A memorial was erected in his honour  in the old churchyard of Angus Glen where he is buried.

Reputation 
Robert Burns praised Alexander Ross, writing "There is I know not what of wild happiness of thought and expression peculiarly beautiful in the old Scottish song style, of which his Grace, old venerable Skinner, the author of Tullochgorum etc., and the late Ross at Lochlee, of true Scottish poetic memory, are the only modern instances that I recollect, since Ramsay, with his contemporaries, and poor Bob Fergusson, went to the world of deathless existence and truly immortal song."

References

External links 
 Helenore at Google Books
 Helenore at Archive.org

1699 births
1784 deaths
18th-century Scottish people
Scottish literature
Scottish poets
Scots-language poets